Rocky Mountain Jam is the ninth live album by the American rock band Little Feat, released in 2007 (see 2007 in music). It is currently the band's most recent live release and features long improvisational jams on most of the songs including a nod to both Miles Davis' "So What" and the Grateful Dead's "Dark Star" at the beginning of "Dixie Chicken."

Track listing
Disc one
"Marginal Creatures" (Barrère, Tackett) – 6:18
"One Clear Moment/Sunday Jam" (Barrère, Fuller, Payne) – 11:52
"Rocket In My Pocket" (George) – 6:59
"Spanish Moon/Skin It Back" (George, Barrère) – 15:34
"Dixie Chicken" (George, Martin) – 21:03
"Feats Don't Fail Me Now" (Barrère, George, Kibbee) – 6:38

Band members
Paul Barrère - guitar, vocals, harmonica
Sam Clayton - percussion, vocals
Kenny Gradney - bass
Richard Hayward - drums, vocals
Shaun Murphy - vocals, percussion
Bill Payne - keyboards, vocals
Fred Tackett - guitar, mandolin, trumpet, vocals

Special guests
Kyle Hollingsworth of The String Cheese Incident plays organ on 'Feats Don't Fail Me Now"

Little Feat live albums
2007 live albums